James Marcus Campbell (born May 19, 1966) is a former Major League Baseball pitcher who played for just portions of two games in one season.

Campbell played for the Kansas City Royals for the two partial games during the 1990 Kansas City Royals season. Earlier, he played college baseball at San Diego State University.

External links

1966 births
Living people
Kansas City Royals players
Major League Baseball pitchers
Baseball players from California
Sportspeople from Santa Maria, California
Baseball City Royals players
Eugene Emeralds players
Memphis Chicks players
Omaha Royals players